Glenda Anna Sluga  (born May 29, 1962, Melbourne), is an Australian historian who has contributed significantly to the history of internationalism, nationalism, diplomacy, immigration, and gender, in Europe, Britain, France, Italy, Yugoslavia, and Australia.

She is Professor of International History and Capitalism at the European University Institute, in Italy, where she is Director of the European Research Council Project ECOINT and Joint Chair of the Department of History and Civilization and the Robert Schumann Centre for Advanced Studies. She is on secondment from her post as Professor of International History at the University of Sydney.

Life 

Sluga was born in Melbourne in 1962. Her parents were Cold War refugees in the 1950s from Slovenian territory of the former Yugoslavia near Trieste. She was raised in the western suburbs of Melbourne and attended Mount Saint Joseph’s Girls College in Altona West.

Education 
She completed her BA (Hons) with First-Class Honours in 1985 at the University of Melbourne where she also received her MA (Hons) in 1987. Her thesis was published in 1988 under the title “Bonegilla, a place of no hope” and received the Vaccari Trust Award for new work on immigration history. In 1986, she received a Rae and Edit Bennet Scholarship for postgraduate study in the UK and was award a Fulbright Travelling Scholarship. However, in 1988, Sluga attended the University of Sussex using a British Council Commonwealth Scholarship where she received her DPhil in 1993 with her thesis “Liberating Trieste, 1945–1954: nation, history, and the Cold War”.

Career 
In 1988, prior to attending the University of Sussex, Sluga was a lecturer at the University of Melbourne. From 1991–1992 she was a Lecturer in Australian Studies at Eötvos Lorand University, Budapest and Kossuth Lajos University, Debrecen, Hungary. In 1993, she became Lecturer in Modern European History in the Department of History at the University of Sydney where she was promoted to Senior Lecturer in 1999 and Associate Professor in 2003. She took a year’s break in 2004 to teach as Associate Professor at the Australian Centre, the University of Melbourne. From 2008 onwards, she has been Professor of International History at the University of Sydney though she is currently seconded to the European University Institute as Professor of International History and Capitalism from 2020–2024. In 2010, Sluga became the Head of the School of Philosophical and Historical Inquiry (SOPHI) at the University of Sydney and was Deputy Head from 2011–2013.

In 2014 she was awarded a prestigious five year Australian Research Council Kathleen Fitzpatrick Laureate Fellowship for her project Inventing the International. She worked with a young team that included Natasha Wheatley, Philippa Hetherington, Sophie Loy-Wilson, Benjamin Huf, Yves Rees, Beatrice Wayne, Sarah Dunstan, and Sabine Selchow amongst others.

Sluga is currently directing the five-year research project: Twentieth-Century International Economic Thinking, and the Complex History of Globalization (ECOINT). The project is funded by the European Research Council’s Advanced Research Grant and looks at how economic thinking has shaped globalization with a focus on the impact of women economic thinkers and business NGOs in international institutions.

Sluga’s research focuses on Modern European history, the East and West from the 18–20th century, the history of Capitalism, European Empires in Asia-Pacific, the history of Internationalism and Nationalism, Settler Societies, Diplomatic History, Environmental History, Women and Gender. She has been published in Italian, Spanish and Swedish and speaks English, French, Italian, and Slovenian.

Awards 
In 2002, she received the Australian Academy of Humanities’ biennial Max Crawford Medal which recognizes outstanding achieved in the humanities by young Australian scholars contributing towards the understanding of their discipline by the general public.  She was elected to the Australian Academy of the Humanities in 2009 and was a founding member of the International Scientific Committee for the History of UNESCO from 2006–2010. She was the 2014–2018  recipient of the Australian Research Council's Kathleen Fitzpatrick Laureate Fellowship.

She has been a visiting fellow at Monash University (1996); the Australian National University (1997); the Institute des Études Politiques de Paris (2000); the European University Institute, Florence (2001); Cambridge University (2001 & 2007); Harvard University (2000 & 2012); the University of Melbourne (2003); Leiden University (2003); the University of Bologna (2009); the Foundation Maison des Sciences de l’Homme, Paris (2012); and the University of Vienna (2013).

Bibliography
 "The history of gendered Jewish internationalism, from the perspective of the history of internationalisms." Journal of Modern Jewish Studies 21.2 (2022): 143-147.
 The invention of international order: remaking Europe after Napoleon (Princeton University Press, 2021) online.
 "From F. Melian Stawell to E. Greene Balch: International and Internationalist Thinking at the Gender Margins, 1919–1947." in Women's International Thought: A New History (Cambridge University Press, 2021).
 with Philippa Hetherington. "Liberal and illiberal internationalisms." Journal of World History  31.1 (2020): 1-9. online

 "Remembering 1919: International organizations and the future of international order". International Affairs 95#1 (2019) pp 25-43. doi:10.1093/ia/iiy242
 Edited with P. Clavin. Internationalisms: A Twentieth-Century History. (Cambridge University Press, 2017)
 "Who Hold the Balance of the World? Bankers at the Congress of Vienna and in International History". American Historical Review, December 2017, 1403–1430. doi:10.1093/ahr/122.5.1403

 Geschichtskolumne. Anfange und End(n) der Weltordnung. Merkur, 2017, 71, 72–81. also published in English as Capitalists and Climate, Humanity, November 2017

 Edited with Carolyn James. Women, diplomacy and international politics since 1500 (Routledge, 2016).
 "Madame de Staël and the transformation of European politics, 1812–17." International History Review 37.1 (2015): 142-166. online
 Internationalism in the Age of Nationalism. University of Pennsylvania Press, 2013 online
 "UNESCO and the (one) world of Julian Huxley." Journal of World History (2010): 393-418. online
 The Problem of Trieste and the Italo-Yugoslav Border: Difference, Identity, and Sovereignty in Twentieth-Century Europe (SUNY Press, 2001).
 "Female and national self‐determination: A gender re‐reading of ‘The Apogee of nationalism’." Nations and Nationalism 6.4 (2000): 495-521. online

 "Identity, gender, and the history of European nations and nationalisms." Nations and Nationalism 4.1 (1998): 87-111. online

 "Trieste: ethnicity and the Cold War, 1945-54." Journal of Contemporary History 29.2 (1994): 285-303.

References

External links 
Glenda Sluga on EUI Cadmus

1962 births
Living people
Women academics
University of Melbourne alumni
Academic staff of the University of Sydney
Academic staff of the European University Institute
Australian historians
People from Melbourne
Fellows of the Australian Academy of the Humanities